Coelus is a genus of beetles in the family Tenebrionidae. They live in coastal dunes along the Pacific Coast of North America.

Species include:
 Coelus gracilis
 Coelus globosus

References

Tenebrionidae genera